Llanddeusant may refer to:
Llanddeusant, Anglesey, North Wales
Llanddeusant, Carmarthenshire, West Wales